The Valea Sărată is a left tributary of the river Arieș in Romania. It discharges into the Arieș near Turda.

References

Rivers of Romania
Rivers of Cluj County